Leopold Immanuel Jacob van Dort (c. 1715–1761) was a Dutch Hebrew professor, responsible for translating an Indian version of the Hebrew New Testament and a Hebrew Quran.

Leopold Immanuel Jacob van Dort was born Jewish between 1714 and 1717 in Dordrecht, Netherlands. He converted to Catholicism in December 1745 in Aachen. He studied briefly philosophy at the University of Leipzig with professor Johann Friedrich May in 1753. In 1754 he was enlisted by the Dutch East India Company (VOC) to work as a professor of Hebrew Language at the Seminary of Colombo, Ceylon. In 1756 he traveled to Cochin, India, where he was commissioned by Ezekiel Rahabi to finish the translation of the Hebrew New Testament (1741-1756), which Claudius Buchanan took with him to England and currently resides in the Cambridge University Library. Ezekiel Rahabi also commissioned van Dort as the translator of the Hebrew Quran (1757-1761), which resides in the Library of Congress in Washington. Van Dort is further known for his 1757 translations of the excerpts of the chronicles of the Jews of Cochin.

Van Dort died in 1761, at the age of 46.

References 

1710s births
1761 deaths
Year of birth uncertain
People from Dordrecht

Dutch expatriates in Sri Lanka
Converts to Roman Catholicism from Judaism
Leipzig University alumni
Translators to Hebrew
Translators of the New Testament into Hebrew
Quranic translation
People of Dutch Ceylon
Jewish Indian history
Jewish Dutch history